Zsolt Müller (born 8 April 1984 in Nyíregyháza) is a Hungarian football player who currently plays for Nyíregyháza Spartacus.

External links
Official Website of integral-dac
HLSZ
EUFO

1984 births
Living people
People from Nyíregyháza
Hungarian footballers
Association football midfielders
Debreceni VSC players
Nyíregyháza Spartacus FC players
Diósgyőri VTK players
Lombard-Pápa TFC footballers
Győri ETO FC players
Integrál-DAC footballers
Bőcs KSC footballers
Kazincbarcikai SC footballers
Balmazújvárosi FC players
Nemzeti Bajnokság I players
Hungarian expatriate footballers
Expatriate footballers in Austria
Hungarian expatriate sportspeople in Austria
Sportspeople from Szabolcs-Szatmár-Bereg County